Howard Matthew Moses Long (born January 6, 1960) is an American sports analyst and former professional football player. He played in the National Football League (NFL) for 13 seasons as a defensive end, spending his entire career with the Raiders franchise in Oakland and Los Angeles. Selected by the Raiders in the second round of the 1981 NFL Draft, Long received eight Pro Bowl and three first-team All-Pro selections while helping the team win a Super Bowl title in Super Bowl XVIII over the Washington Redskins. He was inducted into the Pro Football Hall of Fame in 2000.

After retiring, Long pursued a career in acting and broadcasting and serves as a studio analyst for Fox Sports' NFL coverage.

Early years

Born in Somerville, Massachusetts, Long was raised in Charlestown, Boston, primarily by his uncles and maternal grandmother.

He attended Milford High School in Milford, MA, and is a member of the Milford Hall of Fame. Long was an all-around athlete, playing football (lettered three years and was named to the Scholastic Coach All-America team as a senior, although he had never played football until age 15), basketball (lettered three years as a forward), and track (lettered three years, competing in the shot put, discus, and javelin). Long also set state records in the shot put and discus.

College career
Long played college football at Villanova University near Philadelphia and earned a degree in communications. A four-year letterman for the Wildcats, he was selected to play in the Blue–Gray Football Classic and was named the MVP in 1980. As a freshman, Long started every game and had 99 tackles. As a sophomore in 1978, Long led Villanova in sacks with five and recorded 78 tackles. The next season, Long sustained a thigh injury, missed three games, and ended the season with 46 tackles. As a senior in 1980, Long again led the Wildcats with four sacks and had 84 tackles. He began as a tight end but was moved to the defensive line, playing mostly nose guard his first two seasons.  After moving to defensive end, he earned All-East honors and was honorable mention All-American in his senior year. Long also boxed at Villanova and was the Northern Collegiate Heavyweight Boxing Champion.

Professional career
Selected in the second round of the 1981 NFL Draft by the Oakland Raiders, Long played 13 seasons for the club, wearing the number 75. On the Raiders defensive line, Long earned eight Pro Bowl selections.

He had high aspirations early in his career. He told Football Digest in 1986 that he wanted "Financial security, and I want to be in the Hall of Fame. That's my goal. And I'd like to win a few more Super Bowls." Along the way, he was also named first-team All-Pro three times (in 1983, '84, and '85) and second-team All-Pro twice (in 1986 and 1989). He was selected by John Madden to the All-Madden teams in 1984 and 1985 and was named to the 10th Anniversary All-Madden team in 1994.

Long was voted the NFL Alumni Defensive Lineman of the Year and the NFLPA AFC Defensive Lineman of the Year in 1985. He capped off a stellar 1985 season earning the George Halas Trophy for having been voted the NEA's co-NFL Defensive Player of the Year (along with Andre Tippett). He was also named the Seagrams' Seven Crown NFL Defensive Player of the year. The following year, Long was voted the Miller Lite NFL Defensive Lineman of the Year. Both those awards were taken by polls of NFL players. In 1986, Long was voted to his fourth consecutive Pro Bowl and was key in helping the Raiders record 63 sacks and being the number one defense in the AFC. From 1983 to 1986 the Raiders defense recorded 249 sacks, which tied with the Chicago Bears for tops in the NFL over that span.

Long collected 91 sacks during his career (7 are not official, as sacks were not an official statistic during his rookie year). His career high was in 1983 with 13 sacks, including a career-high five against the Washington Redskins on October 2, 1983. He also intercepted two passes and recovered 10 fumbles during his 13-year career. At the time of his retirement, he was the last player still with the team who had been a Raider before the franchise moved to Los Angeles. He won the Super Bowl XVIII title as the left defensive end with the Raiders (1983 season), beating the Washington Redskins, as he outplayed the opposing offensive tackle, George Starke; the vaunted Washington running game led by John Riggins had only 90 yards in 32 rush attempts.

Long's signature defensive move was the "rip," which employed a quick, uppercut-like motion designed to break an opposing blocker's grip.

Pro Football Weekly (PFW) named Long as one of the ends on its All-time 3–4 defensive front, along with Lee Roy Selmon, Curley Culp, Lawrence Taylor, Andre Tippett, Randy Gradishar, and Harry Carson. PFW based its "Ultimate 3–4" team on the vote of over 40 former NFL players, coaches, and scouts.

After football
After his retirement from the NFL following the 1993 season, Long pursued an acting career, focused mainly on action films—including Firestorm, a 1998 feature in which he starred. He also appeared as a co-star in the suspense movie Broken Arrow, alongside star John Travolta. He played a minor role in the movie 3000 Miles to Graceland alongside Kevin Costner, Kurt Russell and Courteney Cox. In That Thing You Do!, Long appears as Mr. White's (Tom Hanks) "partner" Lloyd in the extended cut of the movie, released on DVD in 2007. Long's part was entirely cut from the theatrical release.

Long also made numerous cameo appearances on TV shows and commercials. Long was a spokesman for Radio Shack, making commercials with actress Teri Hatcher. He has also been featured in many other national commercials and advertising campaigns including those of Coors Light, Nike, Campbell's Chunky Soup, Hanes, Frito Lay, Coca-Cola, Pepsi, Pizza Hut, Taco Bell, Nabisco, Kraft, the Bud Bowl campaign, Honda, and currently for Chevrolet.

In March 1986, Long told Inside Sports: "When I'm finished playing, I'd like to stay in touch with football, through broadcasting. I'm qualified to give a certain perspective and I'm articulate enough to handle it."

After his retirement, Long began as a studio analyst for the Fox Network's NFL coverage, where he often plays the "straight man" to the comic antics of co-host Terry Bradshaw, as well as writing a column for Foxsports.com. In addition, he hosts an annual award show on Fox, Howie Long's Tough Guys, which honors the NFL players whom he deems the toughest and gives "the toughest" a Chevrolet truck. Long won a Sports Emmy Award in 1996 as "Outstanding Sports Personality/Analyst".

Long is also the author of Football for Dummies, a book to help average fans understand the basics of professional football; it is part of the For Dummies series by Wiley Publishing. He is an alumnus of, and volunteers his time for, the Boys and Girls Clubs of America. He was named Walter Camp Man of the Year in 2001 by the Walter Camp Foundation.

After his football career, Long became known for his use of a popular stock sound effect in the movie Broken Arrow. During his death scene, the sound effect is used, which became known as the Howie scream.

 In'N Out (1984) – Groom
 Broken Arrow (1996) – Kelly
 Firestorm (1998) – Jesse
 Dollar for the Dead (1998) – Reager
 3000 Miles to Graceland (2001) – Jack

Personal life
Long met Diane Addonizio during his freshman year at Villanova; they married in 1982, and they have three sons. The eldest, Chris, is a retired defensive end, who played for the St. Louis Rams, New England Patriots, and Philadelphia Eagles, winning two Super Bowls in his own right. The middle son, Kyle, is a guard who played for the Chicago Bears, and played one season for the Kansas City Chiefs after signing with them in March 2021. His youngest, Howie Jr., works in player personnel for the Raiders.  Long is a Roman Catholic.

Awards and honors
NFL
Super Bowl XVIII champion
Three-time First-Team All-Pro
Eight-time Pro Bowl selection
NFL 1980s All-Decade Team

Sports Emmy Awards
1996 - Studio Analyst

Halls of Fame
Pro Football Hall of Fame (2000)

Further reading
 Long, Howie (2007) Football for Dummies, 3rd edition. New York: Wiley. .

References

External links
 
 

1960 births
Living people
American Conference Pro Bowl players
American football defensive ends
College football announcers
Long family (American football)
Los Angeles Raiders players
National Football League announcers
NFL Europe broadcasters
Oakland Raiders players
People from Milford, Massachusetts
Players of American football from Massachusetts
Pro Football Hall of Fame inductees
Sports Emmy Award winners
Sportspeople from Worcester County, Massachusetts
Villanova Wildcats football players
Catholics from Massachusetts